Ramseur can refer to:
 Stephen Dodson Ramseur, one of the youngest Confederate generals in the American Civil War
 Ramseur, North Carolina